Elachista excelsicola is a moth of the family Elachistidae. It is found in Austria, Poland, Fennoscandia and northern Russia. It is also found in North America.

The scales of the forewings are dirty creamy white at the base, unevenly tipped with 
grey, giving the wing a pale grey appearance. The hindwings are pale grey.

References

External links
Lepidoptera of Sweden

excelsicola
Moths described in 1948
Moths of Europe
Moths of North America